Bitterley may refer to:

 Bitterley, a village in Shropshire, England. 
 John Bitterley (died c.1396), member of Parliament for Salisbury 
 Listed buildings in Bitterley 
 Bitterley Hoard, a post-medieval coin hoard
 Church of St Mary, Bitterley